Gossip Girl: Thailand is a Thai teen drama television series produced by Kantana Group and InTouch, based on the American television series Gossip Girl (2007–2012). The first and only season aired on Channel 3 from July 16 to November 19, 2015, for 18 episodes.

Filming started on March 17, 2015, at Swissôtel Nai Lert Park Hotel and ended in early October. An uncut version was uploaded on Kantana Group's YouTube channel on December 30, 2015.

Plot 
Serena Wijitranukul returns to Bangkok following her mysterious disappearance: everyone is extremely shocked including her best friend, Blair Waranon. Blair soon finds out that Serena had slept with her boyfriend, Nate Achirawat, the night of her disappearance. Meanwhile, Serena begins dating Dan Chanaseri while Nate struggles with his feelings for Blair. The two try to salvage what's left of their relationship, only leaving Blair to lose her virginity to Nate's best friend, Jak Benjakij, instead. In the meantime, Jenny Chanaseri constantly tries to make it in this upscale world by following around Blair and her friends.

Characters 
 Sabina Meisinger as Serena Wijitranukul
 Carissa Springett as Blair Waranon
 Victor Jarusak Weerakul as Dan Chanaseri
 Chanon Ukkharachata as Jak Benjakij
 Patrick Chanon Makaramani as Nate Achirawat
 Penny Lane as Sa, Dan's best friend
 Nutcha Jeka as Jenny Chanaseri
 Phan Pagniez as Eric Wijitranukul
 Pete Puntakarn Thongjure as Jo Chanaseri, Dan and Jenny's father
 Cindy Burbridge as Lily Wijitranukul, Serena and Eric's mother
 Ampha Phoosit as Araya, Blair's mother
 Byron Bishop as Songpol Achirawat "The Captain", Nate's father
 Angsana Buranon as Phloi, Nate's mother
 Toon Hiranyasap as Burn Benjakij, Jak's father
 Kejmanee Pichaironnarongsongkhram as Ann, Dan and Jenny's mother
 Sirinuch Petchurai as Phim, Blair's housemaid
 –– as Saiphin, Lily's mother
 Cherlyn Wagstaffe as Kate, Blair's friend
 Ratchaneeboon Pheinwikraisophon as Bell, Blair's friend
 Malinee Adelaide Coates as Geegee Cholticha, Serena's ex friend
 Suchao Pongwilai as Rattapoom Waranon, Blair's father
 Opal Panisara as Gossip Girl (voice)

Accolades

References

External links 
  

2015 Thai television series debuts
2015 Thai television series endings
2010s Thai television series
 
2010s high school television series
Serial drama television series
2010s teen drama television series
Television series about teenagers
Television shows based on American novels
Television shows set in Thailand
Thai television series based on American television series
Channel 3 (Thailand) original programming